Fantasy is a studio album by Ramsey Lewis, released in 1985 on Columbia Records. The album reached No. 13 on the Cashbox Jazz Albums chart.

Overview
Fantasy was produced by Morris Stewart and Maurice White.

Critical reception
Chris Albertson of Stereo Review wrote: "With a little help from Maurice White, his former drummer who hit pop gold with Earth, Wind & Fire, the fifty-year-old pianist has armed himself with synthesizers and come up with a set of sounds that will have a much younger generation gyrating and bopping in the strobe lights." Peter Sleight of the Sun Sentinel stated: "Fantasy, by keyboardist Ramsey Lewis, could be found in any department of the music store. It'll probably show up in jazz simply because of Lewis' long affiliation with jazz. But the recording is clearly non- denominational, drawing equally from jazz, rock, New Wave and R&B." Sleight added: "It succeeds because Lewis has found the secret to electronic instruments: They must be used judiciously, and for the purpose to which they are best suited. To avoid the one-note, one-rhythm pounding that flaws most android music, Lewis creates many layers of electronic tracks. The result is intricate, exotic and unremittingly funky, with Lewis' keyboard melody always rising above the din."

Track listing

References

1985 albums
Ramsey Lewis albums
Albums produced by Maurice White
Columbia Records albums